Larrinoa is a hamlet located in the municipality of Zigoitia, in Álava province, Basque Country, Spain. Unlike the other hamlets in the municipality, it is not organized into a concejo. It is located 15km north-northwest of Vitoria-Gasteiz.

Notable people
 Juan de Álava (1480–1537), architect.

References

Populated places in Álava